The Journal of Health Politics, Policy and Law is a bimonthly peer-reviewed academic journal covering health policy and health law as they relate to politics. It was established in 1976 and is published by Duke University Press. The editor-in-chief is Jonathan Oberlander (University of North Carolina, Chapel Hill). According to the Journal Citation Reports, the journal had a 2021 impact factor of 2.977.

References

External links

Duke University Press academic journals
Health law journals
Publications established in 1976
Bimonthly journals
Health policy journals
English-language journals